Black Friars is an area of Leicester, England, to the west of the city centre.

The area is named after the Dominican friary: Blackfriars, Leicester.

Areas of Leicester